Slaughter the Weak is the second studio album by American death metal band Jungle Rot, released through Pulverizer Records in 1997. In 1998, it was reissued by Pavement Music with the bonus track "Darkness Foretold", and was reissued again in 2002 by Crash Music, Inc., with the same bonus track.

Track listing

Personnel
David Matrise: Vocals/Guitar
Jim Bell: Guitar
Chris Djuricic: Bass Guitar
Rob Pandola: Drums
Produced by Chris "Wisco" Djuricic & Jungle Rot
Cover art and logo by Scott Jackson

1998 debut albums
Jungle Rot albums